Toptani Shopping Center is a shopping mall based in Tirana, Albania. Located about 400 meters from the city center the shopping center was inaugurated on 13 March 2017 and has about 12,790 m2 of retail space covering 7 floors above ground with four underground floors for parking. It accommodates 80 shops, 5 cafes, 2 restaurants and with approximately 600 parking spaces available.

List of prominent stores include Adidas, Calzedonia, Intersport, JYSK, LC Waikiki, Tezenis, Yves Rocher and many other brands.

See also
List of shopping malls in Albania

References

Shopping malls in Tirana
Shopping malls established in 2017
2017 establishments in Albania